Tomi Henrik Fallenius, better known by his stage name Tom Fall, is a Finnish DJ and record producer signed to Armada Music. He has collaborated with notable trance acts including Matisse & Sadko, JES, and Jochen Miller.

Discography

Singles 
2010
 "Lotus/First Sight" [Backcatalogue Bvba]
 "Reflections" (with Something Good) [Silk Music]
 "Dive" [Silk Music]

2011
 "All This Time/Stillness" [Armada Music]
 "Voices" [Silk Music]
 "Untouchable" (with Jwaydan) [Armada Music]

2012
 "Ordinary World" (with Heikki L featuring Ben Andreas) [Armada Music]
 "Hammer" (with Ben Nicky) [Ava Recordings]
 "Irok" [Armada Trice]

2014
 "E18" [Armada Trice]
 "One For Love" (featuring Yoshi Breen) [Armada Trice]

2015
 "Bringin' It Back" [Armada Trice]
 "Break Free" (featuring Laces) [Armada Trice]
 "Come Back" (with Jes) [Armada Trice]

2016
 "Revival" (with Tim White) [Armada Trice]
 "Sober" (with Jochen Miller featuring Tim White) [Armada Zouk]

2017
 "Kaamos" [Armind]
 "Moonless Nights" (with First State) [A State of Trance]

2018
 "Divergent" [A State of Trance]
 "Cyclone" [Armind]
 "Typhoon" [Armind]

2019
 "Solar" [Armada Music]
 "Monsoon" (with Tanner Wilfong) [Armada Music]

2020
 "Guiding Light" [Garuda]

Remixes 
 2011 - TyDi featuring Brianna Holan - Never Go Back (Tom Fall Remix) [Armada Music]
 2011 - Orion and J.Shore - "White Birds" (Tom Fall Remix) [Silk Music]
 2015 - Matisse & Sadko - "Azonto" (Tom Fall Remix) [Armada Trice]
 2016 - Shogun featuring Emma Lock - "Fly Away" (Tom Fall Remix) [Armada]
 2016 - Joonas Hahmo - "Brainflush" (Tom Fall Remix) [Hahmo Recordings]
 2018 - Limelght - "Don't Leave Me Now" (Tom Fall Remix) [Armada Music]
 2018 - Kaion and High 5 - "Timeless" (Tom Fall Remix) [Serendipity Muzik]
 2019 - Morgan Page and Haliene - "Footprints" (Tom Fall Remix) [Armada Music]
 2019 - Gareth Emery and Ashley Wallbridge featuring PollyAnna - "Lionheart" [Garuda]

References

Living people
Year of birth missing (living people)
Finnish DJs
Finnish house musicians
Electronic dance music DJs
Armada Music artists
Monstercat Silk artists